The 2006–07 Tour de Ski was the first Tour to take place, from 31 December 2006 until 7 January 2007. It was won by German Tobias Angerer for men, while Finn Virpi Kuitunen won the women's Tour. 

The first edition of the tour was held in Germany and Italy, with six races spread out over eight days, including two separate days of rest. The prize money for the event amounted to 750,000 Swiss francs, shared out on both men and women. Men's and women's events were held together on the same days.

Origin
Cross-country skiing had been through a period of renewal from the early 1980s, when the free technique was first introduced to the World Championships which led to a rush of new events, including pursuit skiing, sprint skiing and eventually long mass start races, to complement the traditional time trial or individual start style of skiing. The Tour de Ski was modelled on the Tour de France of cycling and the idea has been reported to come from a meeting between former Olympic gold medallist Vegard Ulvang and Jürg Capol, the International Ski Federation's (FIS) chief executive officer for cross-country competitions, in Ulvang's sauna in Maridalen, Norway. Their idea was to create a stage competition consisting of different events which they expected would lead to several days of continuous excitement before the most complete skiers would become Tour de Ski champions.

Ranking
The overall results were based on the aggregate time for all events, as well as bonus seconds awarded on sprint and mass start stages.

The two sprint races carried bonus seconds for the finish, which were subtracted from the overall time, as follows:

In mass start competitions, intermediate points carried bonus seconds; 15 to the winner, 10 to number two, and 5 to number three.  The same number of seconds were awarded at the finish. In the 30 km race there were two intermediate points, in the 15 km race one intermediate point.

Stages

Favourites
Dagbladet's Brynjar Skjærli listed Finland's Virpi Kuitunen as the main favourite in the women's event, with Marit Bjørgen the main challenger. Justyna Kowalczyk, Petra Majdič, Kateřina Neumannová, Evi Sachenbacher-Stehle, Claudia Künzel-Nystad, Aino-Kaisa Saarinen, Vibeke Skofterud and Kristina Šmigun were listed as "outsiders" or dark horses. In the men's event, Tobias Angerer was the favourite, with Yevgeny Dementyev, Tor Arne Hetland, Petter Northug, Eldar Rønning, Anders Södergren, Jens Arne Svartedal and Axel Teichmann all listed as challengers. Frode Estil was named as an outsider.

Stage 1: Sprint Munich, 31 December
This was held at Munich Olympic Stadium in front of 6,500 spectators.

Women's event, 822 m

The listed times were achieved in the qualification race.

Men's event, 1200 m

The listed times were achieved in the qualification race.

Northug fell in the first curve of the final, taking Pettersen and Fredriksson with him.

Stage 2: Pursuit Oberstdorf, 2 January
Women's event, 5 km classical + 5 km free

Bonus seconds earned during the race:
 

Men's event, 10 km classical + 10 km free

Neither Christoph Eigenmann nor Roddy Darragon, number one and three in the overall standings before the race, finished, and were thus eliminated from the overall competition.

Bonus seconds earned during the race:

Stage 3: Individual Start Oberstdorf, 3 January
Women's event, 10 km classical

Men's event, 15 km classical

Stage 4: Sprint Asiago, 5 January
Women's event, 1.2 km

The listed times were achieved in the qualification race.

Men's event, 1.2 km

The listed times were achieved in the qualification race.

Stage 5: Mass Start Cavalese, Val di Fiemme, 6 January
The sprint jersey was awarded after this stage; Virpi Kuitunen of Finland earned 45 bonus points and won the women's black jersey, while Tor Arne Hetland from Norway successfully defended the men's jersey.

Women's event, 15 km

Bonus seconds earned during the race:

Men's event, 30 km

Bonus seconds earned during the race:

Stage 6: Final Climb Cavalese, Val di Fiemme, 7 January
Athletes started in order of the aggregate standings, and the first athlete to reach the finish won. After the first 15 athletes, the remainder were released in a "wave start" five minutes behind Kuitunen, the leader, but their total time behind Kuitunen was added to the final time.

Women's event, 10 km

Men's event, 11 km

A wave start was also employed in the men's event, but the first 30 started according to the time differences in the overall Tour standings. The remainder started six minutes behind Angerer.

See also
2007 in cross-country skiing

References

External links

Tour de Ski
Tour de Ski by year
Tour de Ski 2006-07
Tour de Ski 2006-07